John Price (by 1532 – will proved 1584) was a politician.

Price was from the Inner Temple, London and Gogerddan, Cardiganshire. He was a Member of Parliament for Cardiganshire in October 1553, April 1554, 1563, 1571 and 1572.

References

1584 deaths
16th-century Welsh politicians
Politicians from London
Members of the Parliament of England (pre-1707) for constituencies in Wales
English MPs 1553 (Mary I)
English MPs 1554
English MPs 1563–1567
English MPs 1572–1583
Year of birth uncertain